The 2019–20 GKK Šibenka season is the 10th season in the existence of the club. The club played in the Croatian League.

Overview
On 13 June 2019, club's main sponsor Doğuş Group reported they will leave the club after 7 years as the main sponsor. On 27 June 2019, it was established a new board and owner led by the president Ante Burić. On 6 August 2019, club board reported that the club was changed name to GKK Šibenka (Građanski košarkaški klub Šibenka fully).

Players

Squad information

Depth chart

Transactions

Players In

 
|-
 
|-

|-

|-

|-

|-

|}

Players Out

|}

Club

Technical Staff

Competitions

Croatian League

Regular season

Matches

References

2019–20 in European basketball by club
2019–20 in Croatian basketball